Nelson Cliff is a prominent rock cliff at the west side of Simpson Glacier on the north coast of Victoria Land. First charted by the Northern Party, led by Victor Campbell, of the British Antarctic Expedition, 1910–13. Named for Edward W. Nelson, biologist of the expedition.

Cliffs of Victoria Land
Pennell Coast